Šimun Vosić (also Simone Vossich) (died August 1482) was a Roman Catholic prelate who served as Archbishop (Personal Title) of Capodistria (1473–1482), Titular Archbishop of Patrae (1473–1482), and Archbishop of Bar (1461–1473).

Biography
On 26 October 1461, he was appointed during the papacy of Pope Pius II as Archbishop of Bar. On 26 November 1473, he was appointed during the papacy of Pope Sixtus IV as Archbishop (Personal Title) of Capodistria and Titular Archbishop of Patrae. He served as Archbishop of Capodistria until his death in August 1482.

Episcopal succession

References 

15th-century Roman Catholic archbishops in Serbia
Bishops appointed by Pope Pius II
Bishops appointed by Pope Sixtus IV
1482 deaths